Ivan Fyodorovich Nazhivin (Ива́н Фёдорович Нажи́вин) (25 August [6 September] 1874 in Moscow – 5 April 1940 in Brussels) was a Russian writer. He was a follower of Tolstoy, and published mainly in Dmitriy Tikhomirov's Library for the Family and the School.

Works
 Peasant Children (Krestyanskie deti, 1911–15)
 Rasputin 1923, translated into English by C. J. Hogarth 
 According to Thomas (NY: Harper Bros. 1931) (Information taken from Physical copy of the book in hand)

References

1874 births
1940 deaths
Emigrants from the Russian Empire to Belgium
Writers from the Russian Empire